Chorley Rural District was a rural district in the administrative county of Lancashire, England from 1894 to 1974.

The district was created by the Local Government Act 1894 as the successor to the Chorley Rural Sanitary District. It comprised an area surrounding but did not include the Municipal Borough of Chorley.

Under the Local Government Act 1972, the rural district was abolished in 1974 and its former area became part of the non-metropolitan Borough of Chorley.

Parishes
The district consisted of twenty-two civil parishes:

 Anderton 
 Anglezarke 
 Bretherton 
 Brindle 
 Charnock Richard 
 Clayton-le-Woods 
 Coppull 
 Croston (from 1934) 
 Cuerdon 
 Duxbury (until 1934)
 Eccleston 
 Euxton 
 Heapey 
 Heath Charnock 
 Heskin 
 Hoghton 
 Mawdesley 
 Rivington 
 Ulnes Walton 
 Welch Whittle (until 1934)
 Wheelton
 Whittle-le-Woods

Notes

External links
 Boundary Map of Chorley RD (A Vision of Britain through Time)
 Chorley Rural District (The National Archives)

History of Lancashire
Rural districts of England
Districts of England created by the Local Government Act 1894
Districts of England abolished by the Local Government Act 1972
Local government in Chorley